The Bystrytsia of Solotvyn is a river in Ivano-Frankivsk Oblast of western Ukraine. It joins the Bystrytsia of Nadvirna just north of Ivano-Frankivsk creating the Bystrytsia River. Its name is based on the town of Solotvyn through which the river passes.

It originates on the northern foothills of Small Syvulia mountain (Gorgany mountain massif).

The river has some tributary rivers: the Manyavka, the Sadzhavka, the Radchanka, and the Great Lukavets.

External links

 Bystrytsia Solotvynska River at Encyclopedia of Ukraine.

Rivers of Ivano-Frankivsk Oblast